Tanja Mehlstäubler is a physicist specializing in the field of quantum optical clocks, ion trap based quantum technologies, and precision optical spectroscopy, and is a full time professor at the Leibniz University Hannover in Germany. She is also a guest faculty member at Osaka University, Japan. Mehlstäubler heads a Quantum Clocks and Complex Systems research group at the QUEST Institute for Experimental Quantum Metrology at PTB, Braunshweig. She is involved in developing the high-precision scalable and integrated ion traps for enabling 3D optical access for coherent laser manipulation and clock interrogation. 
Tanja Mehlstäubler received her PhD summa cum laude, in 2005, from the University of Hannover. She worked on thesis titled Novel Cooling Methods for an Optical Frequency Standard Based on Mg Atoms. A part of her graduate studies was completed at the State University of New York as she was the recipient of a Fulbright grant.

References 

German women physicists
Living people
Year of birth missing (living people)
21st-century German physicists
21st-century German women scientists
Academic staff of the University of Hanover
University of Hanover alumni